Pipe Dreams is the debut studio album by alternative rock band Whirr, released on March 13, 2012 by Tee Pee Records. The album served as a follow up to  Distressor, the bands critically acclaimed debut EP.

Reception
Reception for Pipe Dreams was generally positive. Reviewers paid particular attention to the song "Formulas and Frequencies", with Steven Spoerl of PopMatters saying that the song "[was a] haunting acoustic track that utilizes a piano in stunning fashion and really puts a distinguishing mark on the album’s willingness to take unexpected directions in experimentation.", while Martin Douglas of Pitchfork said, "For starters, few shoegaze albums would have the moxie to include a song like "Formulas and Frequencies", which explores texture with an adventurousness that goes beyond tweaking effects pedals. Built around acoustic guitar, piano, and singer Alexandra Morte's floaty soprano, the song is melancholy almost to the point of being a dirge, a slow drift that inches toward the six-minute mark." Ned Raggett of AllMusic said that calling the song "Formulas and Frequencies" was a "dare".

Track listing

References

2012 albums
Whirr (band) albums